The Arizona Diamondbacks' 2016 season was the franchise's 19th season in Major League Baseball and their 19th season at Chase Field and in Phoenix, Arizona. The team finished at 69–93 for their third consecutive losing season, while spending a majority of the season in a back-and-forth battle with the San Diego Padres at the bottom of the NL West standings. The Diamondbacks finished in fourth place. Following the season, General Manager Dave Stewart and Manager Chip Hale were fired.

Regular season

Season standings

National League West

National League Wild Card

Record vs. opponents

Game log

|- bgcolor="ffbbbb"
| 1 || April 4 || Rockies || 5–10 || Miller (1–0) || Greinke (0–1) || — || 48,165 || 0–1
|- bgcolor="bbffbb"
| 2 || April 5 || Rockies || 11–6 || Clippard (1–0) || Bergman (0–1) || — || 21,830 || 1–1
|- bgcolor="ffbbbb"
| 3 || April 6 || Rockies || 3–4 || Chatwood (1–0) || Corbin (0–1) || McGee (1) || 18,572 || 1–2
|- bgcolor="ffbbbb"
| 4 || April 7 || Cubs || 6–14 || Lackey (1–0) || De La Rosa (0–1) || — || 24,656 || 1–3
|- bgcolor="bbffbb"
| 5 || April 8 || Cubs || 3–2 || Ziegler (1–0) || Cahill (0–1) || — || 27,539 || 2–3
|- bgcolor="ffbbbb"
| 6 || April 9 || Cubs || 2–4 || Hendricks (1–0) || Greinke (0–2) || Rondón (1) || 32,185 || 2–4
|- bgcolor="ffbbbb"
| 7 || April 10 || Cubs || 3–7 || Arrieta (2–0) || Miller (0–1) || — || 33,258 || 2–5
|- bgcolor="bbffbb"
| 8 || April 12 || @ Dodgers || 4–2 || Clippard (2–0) || Hatcher (1–1) || Ziegler (1) || 53,279 || 3–5
|- bgcolor="ffbbbb"
| 9 || April 13 || @ Dodgers || 1–3 || Wood (1–1) || De La Rosa (0–2) || Jansen (3) || 44,244 || 3–6
|- bgcolor="ffbbbb"
| 10 || April 14 || @ Dodgers || 2–5 || Howell (1–0) || Delgado (0–1) || Jansen (4) || 40,879 || 3–7
|- bgcolor="bbffbb"
| 11 || April 15 || @ Padres || 3–2 || Hudson (1–0) || Rodney (0–1) || Ziegler (2) || 28,955 || 4–7
|- bgcolor="ffbbbb"
| 12 || April 16 || @ Padres || 3–5 (14) || Perdomo (1–0) || De La Rosa (0–3) || — || 34,051 || 4–8
|- bgcolor="bbffbb"
| 13 || April 17 || @ Padres || 7–3 || Corbin (1–1) || Erlin (1–2) || — || 30,250 || 5–8
|- bgcolor="bbffbb"
| 14 || April 18 || @ Giants || 9–7 (11) || De La Rosa (1–3) || Heston (1–1) || Ziegler (3) || 41,432 || 6–8
|- bgcolor="bbffbb"
| 15 || April 19 || @ Giants || 3–0 || Ray (1–0) || Cain (0–2) || Clippard (1) || 41,218 || 7–8
|- bgcolor="bbffbb"
| 16 || April 20 || @ Giants || 2–1 || Greinke (1–2) || Bumgarner (1–2) || Ziegler (4) || 41,497 || 8–8
|- bgcolor="bbffbb"
| 17 || April 21 || @ Giants || 6–2 || Wagner (1–0) || Cueto (3–1) || — || 41,052 || 9–8
|- bgcolor="ffbbbb"
| 18 || April 22 || Pirates || 7–8 || Niese (3–0) || Corbin (1–2) || Melancon (4) || 27,829 || 9–9
|- bgcolor="bbffbb"
| 19 || April 23 || Pirates || 7–1 || De La Rosa (2–3) || Nicasio (2–2) || — || 32,935 || 10–9
|- bgcolor="ffbbbb"
| 20 || April 24 || Pirates || 10–12 (13) || Feliz (1–0) || Marshall (0–1) || Caminero (1) || 27,573 || 10–10
|- bgcolor="bbffbb"
| 21 || April 25 || Cardinals || 12–7 || Greinke (2–2) || Bowman (0–1) || — || 18,208 || 11–10
|- bgcolor="ffbbbb"
| 22 || April 26 || Cardinals || 2–8 || Martínez (4–0) || Miller (0–2) || — || 19,074 || 11–11
|- bgcolor="ffbbbb"
| 23 || April 27 || Cardinals || 4–11 || Wainwright (1–3) || Corbin (1–3) || — || 18,339 || 11–12
|- bgcolor="bbffbb"
| 24 || April 28 || Cardinals || 3–0 || De La Rosa (3–3) || Wacha (2–1) || Ziegler (5) || 18,933 || 12–12
|- bgcolor="ffbbbb"
| 25 || April 29 || Rockies || 0–9 || Chatwood (3–2) || Ray (1–1) || — || 23,004 || 12–13
|- bgcolor="ffbbbb"
| 26 || April 30 || Rockies || 2–5 || Qualls (2–0) || Ziegler (1–1) || McGee (5) || 32,987 || 12–14
|-

|- bgcolor="ffbbbb"
| 27 || May 1 || Rockies || 3–6 || Bettis (3–1) || Miller (0–3) || McGee (6) || 25,458 || 12–15
|- bgcolor="ffbbbb"
| 28 || May 3 || @ Marlins || 4–7 || Nicolino (2–0) || Chafin (0–1) || Ramos (8) || 16,323 || 12–16
|- bgcolor="ffbbbb"
| 29 || May 4 || @ Marlins || 3–4 || Fernández (3–2) || De La Rosa (3–4) || Ramos (9) || 17,043 || 12–17
|- bgcolor="ffbbbb"
| 30 || May 5 || @ Marlins || 0–4 || Conley (2–1) || Ray (1–2) || — || 16,704 || 12–18
|- bgcolor="bbffbb"
| 31 || May 6 || @ Braves || 7–2 || Greinke (3–2) || Blair (0–2) || — || 23,514 || 13–18
|- bgcolor="bbffbb"
| 32 || May 7 || @ Braves || 4–2 || Miller (1–3) || Norris (1–5) || Ziegler (6) || 22,178 || 14–18
|- bgcolor="bbffbb"
| 33 || May 8 || @ Braves || 5–3 (11) || Delgado (1–1) || Johnson (0–4) || Ziegler (7) || 17,106 || 15–18
|- bgcolor="bbffbb"
| 34 || May 9 || @ Rockies || 10–5 || Bradley (1–0) || Chatwood (4–3) || — || 22,053 || 16–18
|- bgcolor="bbffbb"
| 35 || May 10 || @ Rockies || 5–1 || De La Rosa (4–4) || Rusin (1–1) || — || 23,363 || 17–18
|- bgcolor="ffbbbb"
| 36 || May 11 || @ Rockies || 7–8 || Germen (1–0) || Clippard (2–1) || McGee (9) || 34,890 || 17–19
|- bgcolor="ffbbbb"
| 37 || May 12 || Giants || 2–4 || Cueto (5–1) || Greinke (3–3) || López (1) || 19,461 || 17–20
|- bgcolor="ffbbbb"
| 38 || May 13 || Giants || 1–3 || Samardzija (5–2) || Miller (1–4) || Casilla (8) || 21,753 || 17–21
|- bgcolor="ffbbbb"
| 39 || May 14 || Giants || 3–5 || Strickland (1–0) || Hudson (1–1) || Gearrin (1) || 32,448 || 17–22
|- bgcolor="ffbbbb"
| 40 || May 15 || Giants || 1–2 || Strickland (2–0) || Ziegler (1–2) || Casilla (9) || 25,007 || 17–23
|- bgcolor="bbffbb"
| 41 || May 16 || Yankees || 12–2 || Ray (2–2) || Green (0–1) || — || 32,718 || 18–23
|- bgcolor="bbffbb"
| 42 || May 17 || Yankees || 5–3 || Greinke (4–3) || Pineda (1–5) || Ziegler (8) || 30,913 || 19–23
|- bgcolor="ffbbbb"
| 43 || May 18 || Yankees || 2–4 || Eovaldi (4–2) || Miller (1–5) || Chapman (4) || 32,191 || 19–24
|- bgcolor="bbffbb"
| 44 || May 20 || @ Cardinals || 11–7 || Corbin (2–3) || Martínez (4–4) || Barrett (1) || 43,301 || 20–24
|- bgcolor="ffbbbb"
| 45 || May 21 || @ Cardinals || 2–6 || Leake (3–3) || Ray (2–3) || — || 45,117 || 20–25
|- bgcolor="bbffbb"
| 46 || May 22 || @ Cardinals || 7–2 || Greinke (5–3) || García (3–4) || — || 43,829 || 21–25
|- bgcolor="ffbbbb"
| 47 || May 24 || @ Pirates || 1–12 || Liriano (4–3) || Miller (1–6) || — || 18,415 || 21–26
|- bgcolor="ffbbbb"
| 48 || May 25 || @ Pirates || 4–5 || Locke (3–3) || De La Rosa (4–5) || Melancon (16) || 20,696 || 21–27
|- bgcolor="ffbbbb"
| 49 || May 26 || @ Pirates || 3–8 || Schugel (1–1) || Corbin (2–4) || — || 30,861 || 21–28
|- bgcolor="ffbbbb"
| 50 || May 27 || Padres || 3–10 || Friedrich (1–1) || Ray (2–4) || — || 24,935 || 21–29
|- bgcolor="bbffbb"
| 51 || May 28 || Padres || 8–7 || Greinke (6–3) || Vargas (0–3) || — || 23,927 || 22–29
|- bgcolor="bbffbb"
| 52 || May 29 || Padres || 6–3 ||  Bradley (2–0) || Pomeranz (4–5) || Ziegler (9) || 21,458 || 23–29
|- bgcolor="ffbbbb"
| 53 || May 30 || Astros || 3–8 || McHugh (5–4) || Escobar (0–1) || — || 24,798 || 23–30
|- bgcolor="ffbbbb"
| 54 || May 31 || Astros || 5–8 || McCullers (2–1) || Corbin (2–5) || Gregerson (13) || 15,556 || 23–31
|-

|- bgcolor="ffbbbb"
| 55 || June 1 || @ Astros || 4–5 (11) || Feliz (4–1) || Clippard (2–2) || — || 22,642 || 23–32
|- bgcolor="bbffbb"
| 56 || June 2 || @ Astros || 3–0 || Greinke (7–3) || Keuchel (3–7) || Ziegler (10) || 21,764 || 24–32
|- bgcolor="ffbbbb"
| 57 || June 3 || @ Cubs || 0–6 || Lackey (6–2) || Bradley (2–1) || — || 38,813 || 24–33
|- bgcolor="ffbbbb"
| 58 || June 4 || @ Cubs || 3–5 || Hammel (7–1) || Escobar (0–2) || Rondón (10) || 40,415 || 24–34
|- bgcolor="bbffbb"
| 59 || June 5 || @ Cubs || 3–2 || Corbin (3–5) || Arrieta (9–1) || Ziegler (11) || 41,596 || 25–34
|- bgcolor="ffbbbb"
| 60 || June 6 || Rays || 4–6 || Archer (4–7) || Ray (2–5) || Colomé (16) || 17,176 || 25–35
|- bgcolor="bbffbb"
| 61 || June 7 || Rays || 5–0 || Greinke (8–3) || Moore (2–4) || — || 17,964 || 26–35
|- bgcolor="ffbbbb"
| 62 || June 8 || Rays || 3–6 || Odorizzi (3–3) || Bradley (2–2) || Colomé (17) || 16,954 || 26–36
|- bgcolor="ffbbbb"
| 63 || June 10 || Marlins || 6–8 || Ellington (1–0) || Clippard (2–3) || Ramos (19) || 26,970 || 26–37
|- bgcolor="bbffbb"
| 64 || June 11 || Marlins || 5–3 || Godley (1–0) || Fernández (9–3) || Ziegler (12) || 33,442 || 27–37
|- bgcolor="bbffbb"
| 65 || June 12 || Marlins || 6–0 || Ray (3–5) || Conley (3–4) || — || 27,741 || 28–37
|- bgcolor="bbffbb"
| 66 || June 13 || Dodgers || 3–2 || Greinke (9–3) || Bolsinger (1–4) || Ziegler (13) || 21,374 || 29–37
|- bgcolor="ffbbbb"
| 67 || June 14 || Dodgers || 4–7 || Maeda (6–4) || Bradley (2–3) || Jansen (18) || 23,458 || 29–38
|- bgcolor="ffbbbb"
| 68 || June 15 || Dodgers || 2–3 || Kershaw (10–1) || Corbin (3–6) || Jansen (19) || 27,792 || 29–39
|- bgcolor="bbffbb"
| 69 || June 17 || @ Phillies || 10–2 || Ray (4–5) || Morgan (1–6) || — || 19,282 || 30–39
|- bgcolor="bbffbb"
| 70 || June 18 || @ Phillies || 4–1 || Greinke (10–3) || Eickhoff (4–9) || Ziegler (14) || 33,797 || 31–39
|- bgcolor="bbffbb"
| 71 || June 19 || @ Phillies || 5–1 || Bradley (3–3) || Eflin (0–2) || — || 40,214 || 32–39
|- bgcolor="bbffbb"
| 72 || June 20 || @ Phillies || 3–1 || Miller (2–6) || Hellickson (4–6) || Ziegler (15) || 22,118 || 33–39
|- bgcolor="bbffbb"
| 73 || June 21 || @ Blue Jays || 4–2 || Corbin (4–6) || Estrada (5–3) || Hudson (1) || 41,838 || 34–39
|- bgcolor="ffbbbb"
| 74 || June 22 || @ Blue Jays || 2–5 || Happ (9–3) || Ray (4–6) || Osuna (14) || 46,967 || 34–40
|- bgcolor="bbffbb"
| 75 || June 23 || @ Rockies || 7–6 || Ziegler (2–2) || Estévez (1–4) || — || 36,558 || 35–40
|- bgcolor="bbffbb"
| 76 || June 24 || @ Rockies || 10–9 || Collmenter (1–0) || Estévez (1–5) || Ziegler (16) || 35,216 || 36–40
|- bgcolor="ffbbbb"
| 77 || June 25 || @ Rockies || 6–11 || De La Rosa (5–4) || Miller (2–7) || Germen (1) || 33,337 || 36–41
|- bgcolor="ffbbbb"
| 78 || June 26 || @ Rockies || 7–9 || Estévez (2–5) || Bracho (0–1) || — || 32,435 || 36–42
|- bgcolor="ffbbbb"
| 79 || June 27 || Phillies || 0–8 || Velasquez (6–2) || Ray (4–7) || — || 22,567 || 36–43
|- bgcolor="ffbbbb"
| 80 || June 28 || Phillies || 3–4 || Neris (2–3) || Ziegler (2–3) || Gómez (21) || 19,645 || 36–44
|- bgcolor="ffbbbb"
| 81 || June 29 || Phillies || 8–9 (10) || Gómez (3–2) || Bracho (0–2) || Oberholtzer (1) || 18,603 || 36–45
|-

|- bgcolor="ffbbbb"
| 82 || July 1 || Giants || 4–6 || Cueto (12–1) || Miller (2–8) || Casilla (18) || 24,859 || 36–46
|- bgcolor="bbffbb"
| 83 || July 2 || Giants || 6–5 || Barrett (1–0) || Strickland (3–1) || Ziegler (17) || 30,683 || 37–46
|- bgcolor="ffbbbb"
| 84 || July 3 || Giants || 4–5 (11) || Osich (1–1) || Burgos (0–1) || Casilla (19) || 26,171 || 37–47
|- bgcolor="ffbbbb"
| 85 || July 4 || Padres || 4–8 || Perdomo (3–3) || Bradley (3–4) || — || 39,203 || 37–48
|- bgcolor="bbffbb"
| 86 || July 5 || Padres || 7–5 || Godley (2–0) || Friedrich (4–4) || Ziegler (18) || 14,110 || 38–48
|- bgcolor="ffbbbb"
| 87 || July 6 || Padres || 6–13 || Dominguez (1–0) || Miller (2–9) || — || 17,091 || 38–49
|- bgcolor="ffbbbb"
| 88 || July 8 || @ Giants || 2–6 || Samardzija (9–5) || Corbin (4–7) || — || 41,576 || 38–50
|- bgcolor="ffbbbb"
| 89 || July 9 || @ Giants || 2–4 || Kontos (2–1) || Ray (4–8) || Casilla (21) || 41,571 || 38–51
|- bgcolor="ffbbbb"
| 90 || July 10 || @ Giants || 0–4 || Bumgarner (10–4) || Bradley (3–5) || — || 42,075 || 38–52
|- style="text-align:center; background:#bbcaff;"
| colspan="9" | 87th All-Star Game in San Diego, California
|- bgcolor="ffbbbb"
| 91 || July 15 || Dodgers || 7–13 || Norris (5–7) || Corbin (4–8) || — || 30,639 || 38–53
|- bgcolor="bbffbb"
| 92 || July 16 || Dodgers || 2–1 (12) || Delgado (2–1) || Fien (1–1) || — || 38,899 || 39–53
|- bgcolor="bbffbb"
| 93 || July 17 || Dodgers || 6–5 || Ray (5–8) || Maeda (8–7) || Barrett (2) || 29,459 || 40–53
|- bgcolor="ffbbbb"
| 94 || July 19 || Blue Jays || 1–5 || Sanchez (10–1) || Godley (2–1) || — || 26,626 || 40–54
|- bgcolor="ffbbbb"
| 95 || July 20 || Blue Jays || 4–10 || Stroman (8–4) || Corbin (4–9) || — || 20,076 || 40–55
|- bgcolor="ffbbbb"
| 96 || July 22 || @ Reds || 2–6 || Straily (5–6) || Bradley (3–6) || — || 24,252 || 40–56
|- bgcolor="ffbbbb"
| 97 || July 23 || @ Reds || 1–6 || Lorenzen (1–0) || Ray (5–9) || — || 23,963 || 40–57
|- bgcolor="bbffbb"
| 98 || July 24 || @ Reds || 9–8 || Godley (3–1) || Finnegan (5–8) || — || 25,304 || 41–57
|- bgcolor="ffbbbb"
| 99 || July 25 || @ Brewers || 2–7 || Anderson (5–10) || Shipley (0–1) || — || 25,347 || 41–58
|- bgcolor="ffbbbb"
| 100 || July 26 || @ Brewers || 4–9 || Thornburg (4–4) || Hudson (1–2) || — || 24,074 || 41–59
|- bgcolor="bbffbb"
| 101 || July 27 || @ Brewers || 8–1 || Bradley (4–6) || Nelson (6–9) || — || 22,581 || 42–59
|- bgcolor="ffbbbb"
| 102 || July 28 || @ Brewers || 4–6 || Davies (8–4) || Ray (5–10) || Jeffress (24) || 33,971 || 42–60
|- bgcolor="ffbbbb"
| 103 || July 29 || @ Dodgers || 7–9 || Baez (3–2) || Curtis (0–1) || Jansen (31) || 50,966 || 42–61
|- bgcolor="bbffbb"
| 104 || July 30 || @ Dodgers || 4–2 || Shipley (1–1) || Kazmir (9–4) || Barrett (3) || 49,540 || 43–61
|- bgcolor="ffbbbb"
| 105 || July 31 || @ Dodgers || 3–14 || Coleman (2–1) || Corbin (4–10) || — ||42,380 || 43–62
|-

|- bgcolor="ffbbbb"
| 106 || August 1 || Nationals || 1–14 || Strasburg (15–1) || Bradley (4–7) || — || 17,518 || 43–63
|- bgcolor="ffbbbb"
| 107 || August 2 || Nationals || 4–10 || Roark (11–6) || Ray (5–11) || — || 19,919 || 43–64
|- bgcolor="ffbbbb"
| 108 || August 3 || Nationals || 3–8 || Scherzer (12–6) || Godley (3–2) || — || 17,086 || 43–65
|- bgcolor="bbffbb"
| 109 || August 5 || Brewers || 3–2 (11) || Loewen (1–0) || Boyer (1–2) || — || 20,008 || 44–65
|- bgcolor="ffbbbb"
| 110 || August 6 || Brewers || 6–15 || Garza (3–4) || Corbin (4–11) || — || 29,370 || 44–66
|- bgcolor="bbffbb"
| 111 || August 7 || Brewers || 9–3 || Hudson (2–2) || Nelson (6–11) || — || 24,021 || 45–66
|- bgcolor="bbffbb"
| 112 || August 9 || @ Mets || 5–3 || Greinke (11–3) || Robles (5–4) || Barrett (4) || 31,884 || 46–66
|- bgcolor="bbffbb"
| 113 || August 10 || @ Mets || 3–2 (12) || Delgado (3–1) || Blevins (4–2) || — || 31,277 || 47–66
|- bgcolor="bbffbb"
| 114 || August 11 || @ Mets || 9–0 || Shipley (2–1) || Syndergaard (9–7) || — || 39,271 || 48–66
|- bgcolor="ffbbbb"
| 115 || August 12 || @ Red Sox || 4–9 || Price (10–8) || Corbin (4–12) || — || 37,555 || 48–67
|- bgcolor="ffbbbb"
| 116 || August 13 || @ Red Sox || 3–6 || Ross Jr. (2–2) || Bradley (4–8) || Kimbrel (19) || 37,653 || 48–68
|- bgcolor="ffbbbb"
| 117 || August 14 || @ Red Sox || 2–16 || Porcello (16–3) || Greinke (11–4) || — || 36,842 || 48–69
|- bgcolor="bbffbb"
| 118 || August 15 || Mets || 10–6 || Ray (6–11) || Colón (10–7) || — || 17,340 || 49-69
|- bgcolor="ffbbbb"
| 119 || August 16 || Mets || 5–7 || Syndergaard (10–7) || Shipley (2–2) || Familia (40) || 20,790 || 49–70
|- bgcolor="bbffbb"
| 120 || August 17 || Mets || 13–5 || Godley (4–2) || Niese (8–7) || — || 18,469 || 50–70
|- bgcolor="ffbbbb"
| 121 || August 18 || @ Padres || 8–9 || Buchter (3–0) || Barrett (1–1) || Maurer (66) || 20,790 || 50–71
|- bgcolor="ffbbbb"
| 122 || August 19 || @ Padres || 4–7 (10) || Quackenbush (7–4) || Corbin (4–13) || – || 26,080 || 50–72
|- bgcolor="bbffbb"
| 123 || August 20 || @ Padres || 2–1 || Ray (7–11) || Richard (0–3) || Burgos (1) || 17,340 || 51–72
|- bgcolor="ffbbbb"
| 124 || August 21 || @ Padres || 1–9 || Perdomo (6–7) || Shipley (2–3) || – || 28,150 || 51–73
|- bgcolor="bbffbb"
| 125 || August 22 || Braves || 9–8 || Burgos (1–1) || Gant (1–3) || – || 15,789 || 52–73
|- bgcolor="ffbbbb"
| 126 || August 23 || Braves || 4–7 || Ramírez (2–0) || Barrett (1–2) || Johnson (11) || 18,780 || 52–74
|- bgcolor="bbffbb"
| 127 || August 24 || Braves || 10–9 (11) || Corbin (5–13) || Ramírez (2–1) || – || 15,376 || 53–74
|- bgcolor="ffbbbb"
| 128 || August 25 || Braves || 2–3 || Wisler (5–11) || Ray (7–12) || Johnson (12) || 18,698 || 53–75
|- bgcolor="bbffbb"
| 129 || August 26 || Reds || 4–3 (11) || Escobar (1–2) || Wood (5–3) || – || 26,087 || 54–75
|- bgcolor="ffbbbb"
| 130 || August 27 || Reds || 0–13 || DeSclafani (8–2) || Godley (4–3) || – || 34,395 || 54–76
|- bgcolor="bbffbb"
| 131 || August 28 || Reds || 11–2 || Bradley (5–8) || Bailey (2–3) || – || 22,624 || 55–76
|- bgcolor="bbffbb"
| 132 || August 30 || @ Giants || 4–3 || Greinke (12–4) || Cueto (14–5) || Hudson (2) || 41,443 || 56–76
|- bgcolor="ffbbbb"
| 133 || August 31 || @ Giants || 2–4 || Moore (9–10) || Miller (2–10) || Casilla (29) || 41,447 || 56–77
|-

|- bgcolor="ffbbbb"
| 134 || September 2 || @ Rockies || 7–14 || Estévez (3–7) || Burgos (1–2) || – || 23,002 || 56–78
|- bgcolor="bbffbb"
| 135 || September 3 || @ Rockies || 9–4 || Shipley (3–3) || Chatwood (10–9) || – || 30,280 || 57–78
|- bgcolor="bbffbb"
| 136 || September 4 || @ Rockies || 8–5 || Bradley (6–8) || Gray (9–7) || – || 31,981 || 58–78
|-bgcolor="ffbbbb"
| 137 || September 5 || @ Dodgers || 2–10 || Maeda (14–8) || Greinke (12–5) || — || 41,820 || 58–79
|-bgcolor="ffbbbb"
| 138 || September 6 || @ Dodgers || 2–5 || Stripling (4–6) || Miller (2–11) || Jansen (42) || 42,457 || 58–80
|-bgcolor="ffbbbb"
| 139 || September 7 || @ Dodgers || 1–3 || Stewart (1–2) || Ray (7–13) || Jansen (43) || 44,352 || 58–81
|-bgcolor="ffbbbb"
| 140 || September 9 || Giants || 6–7 (12) || Nathan (2–0) || Leone (0–1) || Gearrin (3) || 26,492 || 58–82
|-bgcolor="ffbbbb"
| 141 || September 10 || Giants || 3–11 || Cueto (15–5) || Bradley (6–9) || — || 32,301|| 58–83
|-bgcolor="ffbbbb"
| 142 || September 11 || Giants || 3–5 || Moore (3–4) || Greinke (12–6) || Strickland (3) || 26,008 || 58–84
|- bgcolor="bbffbb"
| 143 || September 12 || Rockies || 12–9 || Delgado (4–1) || Lyles (4–5) || Hudson (3) || 20,637 || 59–84
|- bgcolor="bbffbb"
| 144 || September 13 || Rockies || 11–4 || Ray (8–13) || De La Rosa (8–8) || Koch (1) || 20,897 || 60–84
|- bgcolor="bbffbb"
| 145 || September 14 || Rockies || 11–6 || Shipley (4–3) || Hoffman (0–4) || — || 19,801 || 61–84
|- bgcolor="bbffbb"
| 146 || September 15 || Dodgers || 7–3 || Bradley (7–9) || Hill (12–4) || Corbin (1) || 27,126 || 62–84
|-bgcolor="ffbbbb"
| 147 || September 16 || Dodgers || 2–3 || Maeda (15–9) || Greinke (12–7) || Jansen (45) || 28,211 || 62–85
|-bgcolor="ffbbbb"
| 148 || September 17 || Dodgers || 2–6 || Stewart (2–2) || Miller (2–12) || — || 38,255 || 62–86
|- bgcolor="bbffbb"
| 149 || September 18 || Dodgers || 10–9  || Koch (1–0) || Stripling (4–8) || — || 26,159 || 63–86
|-bgcolor="ffbbbb"
| 150 || September 19 || @ Padres || 2–3 || Richard (3−3) || Shipley (4−4) || Maurer (11) || 20,250 || 63–87
|-bgcolor="ffbbbb"
| 151 || September 20 || @ Padres || 2–5 || Hessler (1–0) || Godley (4−4) || Maurer (12) || 34,319 || 63–88
|- bgcolor="bbffbb"
| 152 || September 21 || @ Padres || 3–2 || Greinke (4−4) || Perdomo (8–10) || Hudson (4) || 22,110 || 64–88
|-bgcolor="ffbbbb"
| 153 || September 23 || @ Orioles || 2–3 (12) || Drake  (1–0) || Koch (1–1) || — || 37,815 || 64–89
|-bgcolor="ffbbbb"
| 154 || September 24 || @ Orioles || 1–6 || Miley (9–13) || Ray (8–14) || — || 40,610 || 64–90
|-bgcolor="ffbbbb"
| 155 || September 25 || @ Orioles || 1–2 || Bundy (10–6) || Shipley (4–5) || Britton (46) || 31,229 || 64–91
|- bgcolor="bbffbb"
| 156 || September 26 || @ Nationals || 14–4 || Godley (5–4) || Roark (15–10) || — || 18,707 || 65–91
|-bgcolor="ffbbbb"
| 157 || September 27 || @ Nationals || 2–4 || Scherzer (19–7) || Delgado (4–2) || Melancon (44) || 24,297 || 65–92
|- bgcolor="bbffbb"
| 158 || September 28 || @ Nationals || 3–0 (6) || Miller (3–12) || Gonzalez (11–11) || — || 20,577 || 66–92
|-bgcolor="ffbbbb"
| 159 || September 29 || @ Nationals || 3–5 || López (5–3) || Ray (8–15) || Melancon (45) || 21,618 || 66–93
|-bgcolor="bbffbb"
| 160 || September 30 || Padres || 5–3 || Delgado (5–2) || Jackson (5–7) || Hudson (5) || 42,651 || 67–93
|-

|-bgcolor="bbffbb"
| 161 || October 1 || Padres || 9–5 || Bradley (8–9) || Richard (3–4) || — || 32,811 || 68–93
|-bgcolor="bbffbb"
| 162 || October 2 || Padres || 3–2 || Hudson' (3–2) || Hand (4–4) || — || 31,385 || 69–93
|-

|-
| Legend:       = Win       = Loss       = PostponementBold = Diamondbacks team member''

Roster

Farm system

References

External links

 2016 Arizona Diamondbacks season at Baseball Reference
 2016 Arizona Diamondbacks season Official Site

Arizona Diamondbacks
Arizona Diamondbacks
Arizona Diamondbacks seasons